Marathassa Valley is a beautiful and fertile valley in the Troödos Mountains of Cyprus. It takes its name from the plant Marathos (Greek: Μάραθος), a type of fennel which grows in the area.

The area is known for its splendid cherries. The valley is about a 65 km drive from Limassol. It is to the north of Mount Olympus and it extends into the administrative territory of both Nicosia and Limassol district.

It is the highest inhabited valley on the island home to a total of 12 villages, including Prodromos,  Lemythou, Tris Elies, Kalopanayiotis and Moutoullas. It is home to Trooditissa and Kykkos monasteries.

Valleys of Cyprus